Sharnbrook is a village and civil parish located in the Borough of Bedford in Bedfordshire, England, situated around  north-west of Bedford town centre.

The settlement was recorded in the Domesday Book of 1086 as a parish within the Hundred of Willey but was probably first developed in Saxon times. The oldest surviving building, St Peter's Church, is Norman. The name is believed to be derived from the Anglo Saxon word sharn meaning dung. Many of the older buildings in the village are constructed of the local oolitic limestone, also used in other traditional north Bedfordshire settlements.

Situated just north of a loop in the River Great Ouse and almost due north of Bedford, the village has developed as a ribbon-settlement running south-east to north-west, with the core of the community clustered at the north-western end.

Education
The village has two schools, the larger of which Sharnbrook Academy has a campus on the west of the village, serves a wide area and was attended by the marathon world record holder Paula Radcliffe, who opened the Paula Radcliffe Sharnbrook Community Sports Centre named after her in April 2005. This Community Sports Centre is not only for students but also serves the wider local community of North Bedfordshire with sporting facilities. Students are aged from 11 to 18 and take both GCSE and A Level exams. The village's other school is Sharnbrook Primary which caters for young children aged from 3–11 years old who live in the immediate area.

Industry
Another major presence is the multinational company Unilever which has the Lipton Institute of Tea research centre on the north-western edge of the village. This uses the grounds of Colworth House, originally built in the early 17th century and rebuilt in its present form by 1774 as a private house. The house itself is used as office space, with modern laboratory buildings beside and behind it. The site is being turned into a science park for use by a number of companies.

Sport
Sharnbrook is home to the village's boys' and men's football teams, which predate by many years the women's team that was established in 2002.

Transport
Sharnbrook railway station opened in 1857, but was closed in 1960.

Sharnbrook is served by bus service 50 which is operated by Stagecoach and operates between Kettering and Bedford. The service is hourly Monday to Saturday and two hourly on Sundays and Bank Holidays.

Literature
Sharnbrook is the village where the prototype of Uncle Silas, Joseph Betts, the protagonist of H.E. Bates's My Uncle Silas lived.

Wildlife 

Sharnbrook is home to a colony of red kites.

Britain's youngest father
In 1998, Sharnbrook resident Sean Stewart become the youngest father in Britain at only twelve years of age. He lived next door to the mother of his child, Emma Webster, who was four years older than he. The child was conceived when the pair were only 11 and 15. Webster said Stewart had told her he was her age when they started going out. Some also consider Stewart to be the youngest father ever recorded.

Gallery

References

External links

 Colworth Park
 The Sharnbrook Village Website
 Sharnbrook Upper School Website
 The Sharnbrook Upper School Alumni Website
 The Paula Radcliffe Sharnbrook Community Sports Centre Website
 Sharnbrook Evangelical Church
 Sharnbrook Women's Football Club
Britishlistedbuildings.co.uk

 
Villages in Bedfordshire
Civil parishes in Bedfordshire
Borough of Bedford